Ahern, also Aherne (Irish: Ó hEachtighearna/Ó hEachthairn) is an Irish surname. Notable people with the surname include:

Members of the political Ahern family in Ireland
Bertie Ahern (born 1951), former Taoiseach (prime minister) of Ireland
Cecelia Ahern (born 1981), author, daughter of Bertie Ahern
Maurice Ahern (born 1938/39), Irish politician, former Lord Mayor of Dublin, brother of Bertie
Noel Ahern (born 1944), Irish politician, brother of Bertie

Other people
Aoife Ahern, Dean of Engineering at University College, Dublin

Brian Aherne (1902–1986), English actor
Caroline Aherne (1963–2016), English comedian
Cornelius Ahern (1871–1955), Australian politician
Dan Ahern (1898–1963), American football player
David Ahern (1947–1988), Australian avant-garde composer
Dermot Ahern (born 1955), Irish Minister for Justice, Equality and Law Reform
Francis J. Ahern (1899–1958), San Francisco Police Chief 1956–58
Fred Ahern (disambiguation), several people
Gene Ahern (1895–1960), American comic-strip artist
Jayson P. Ahern, U.S. Customs Agency commissioner
Jerry Ahern (1946–2012), American science fiction author
John Ahern (disambiguation), several people
Kathy Ahern (1949–1996), American golfer
Kit Ahern (1915–2007), Irish politician
Lassie Lou Ahern (1920–2018), American actress
Liam Ahern (1916–1974), Irish politician
Lizzie Ahern (1877–1969), political activist and socialist from Australia
Mary Eileen Ahern (1860–1938), American librarian
Mary V. Ahern (1922–2021), American radio and television producer
Michael Ahearne (born 1966), American professor of marketing
Michael Ahern (disambiguation), several people
Nuala Ahern (born 1949), Irish politician
Peggy Ahern (1917–2012), American actress
Pat Aherne (1901–1970), English actor
Steve Ahern (born 1959), Australian media consultant
Tom Aherne (1919–1999), Irish footballer and hurler
Thomas Ahern (businessman) (1884–1970), Western Australian businessman
 Thomas Ahern (rugby union), Irish rugby union player
Valerie Ahern, American television screenwriter and producer

Other uses
In the same way that the onomatopoeic expression "rhubarb-rhubarb" was used to represent the sounds uttered by members of the British House of Commons, "hearn-hearn" was often used in the Goon Show to represent the sounds uttered by speakers of US English (e.g., The Sleeping Prince).

The Irish sept of Ahearn/Ahern descends from Echthighern mac Cennétig.

See also
Ahearn
Hearn (disambiguation)

References

Septs of the Dál gCais
Surnames of Irish origin
Anglicised Irish-language surnames